Recordo Olton Gordon (born 12 October 1991) is a Jamaican–born English cricketer. Gordon is a right-handed batsman who bowls right-arm fast-medium. He was born at St. Elizabeth's, Jamaica.

Gordon played minor counties cricket for Herefordshire in 2011, making a single appearance for the county in the MCCA Knockout Trophy against Bedfordshire. Signed by Warwickshire in that same season, he made impressive performances for the county second XI in that season, before suffering a stress fracture of his back following a pre–season tour to Barbados in early 2012, missing the entire season. Gordon later made his full debut for the county in their first first-class match of the 2013 season against Oxford MCCU at the University Parks, scoring 15 runs in the match and taking the wickets of Sam Agarwal and Stewart Davison in Oxford's first-innings, before taking the wicket of Ben Williams in their second-innings.

In November 2020, Gordon was signed by Audley Cricket Club to play in the North Staffordshire and South Cheshire League during the summer of 2021 in England.

References

External links
 

1991 births
Living people
English cricketers
Herefordshire cricketers
Warwickshire cricketers
People from Saint Elizabeth Parish
Cambridgeshire cricketers